The 2018 L'Open 35 de Saint-Malo was a professional tennis tournament played on outdoor clay courts. It was the twenty-third edition of the tournament and was part of the 2018 ITF Women's Circuit. It took place in Saint-Malo, France, on 17–23 September 2018.

Singles main draw entrants

Seeds 

 1 Rankings as of 10 September 2018.

Other entrants 
The following players received a wildcard into the singles main draw:
  Timea Bacsinszky
  Clara Burel
  Harmony Tan
  Lucie Wargnier

The following players received entry from the qualifying draw:
  María Fernanda Herazo
  Diāna Marcinkēviča
  Liudmila Samsonova
  Marie Témin

The following players received entry as lucky losers:
  Marie Benoît
  Margot Yerolymos

Champions

Singles

 Liudmila Samsonova def.  Katarina Zavatska, 6–0, 6–2

Doubles

 Cristina Bucșa /  María Fernanda Herazo def.  Alexandra Cadanțu /  Diāna Marcinkēviča, 4–6, 6–1, [10–8]

External links 
 2018 L'Open 35 de Saint-Malo at ITFtennis.com
 Official website

2018 ITF Women's Circuit
2018 in French tennis
L'Open 35 de Saint-Malo